Fred Reed may refer to:

 Fred A. Reed (born 1939), journalist, author and translator
 Fred Reed (footballer) (1894–1967), English football centre half